Elroy Gelant (born 25 August 1986) is a South African athlete competing primarily in the long-distance events. He finished 12th at the 2012 Indoor and 2013 Outdoor World Championships.

He competed in the men's marathon at the 2020 Summer Olympics.

Competition record

References

1986 births
Living people
South African male long-distance runners
Athletes (track and field) at the 2016 Summer Olympics
Olympic athletes of South Africa
Universiade medalists in athletics (track and field)
Universiade bronze medalists for South Africa
Medalists at the 2009 Summer Universiade
Athletes (track and field) at the 2020 Summer Olympics
20th-century South African people
21st-century South African people